Allwood is a surname. Notable people with the surname include:

Jens Allwood (born 1947), linguist
Matthew Allwood (born 1992), Australian rugby league player
Ralph Allwood (born 1950), once head of music at Eton College, England
Robert Allwood (1803–1891), English-born clergyman and academic in colonial Australia

See also
Allwood Green, an area of Suffolk, England